Summit County Courthouse may refer to:

Summit County Courthouse (Ohio), Akron, Ohio
 Summit County Courthouse (Utah), Coalville, Utah